Septobasidium euryae-groffii is a plant pathogenic fungus in the genus Septobasidium. It was first isolated from Eurya groffii.

References

Further reading

Chen, Suzhen, and Lin Guo. "Three new species of Septobasidium (Septobasidiaceae) from Hainan Province in China." Mycotaxon 120.1 (2012): 269–276.
Chen, Su-Zhen, and Lin Guo. "Three new species and three new Chinese records of Septobasidium (Septobasidiaceae)." Mycosystema 31 (2012): 651–655.

External links

MycoBank

Fungal plant pathogens and diseases
Teliomycotina